Jonathan David Hoke (born January 24, 1957) is an American football coach who is the Passing game coordinator and cornerbacks coach for the Chicago Bears of the National Football League (NFL). He previously served as the defensive coordinator at the University of Maryland, College Park from 2019 to 2020 and also served as the defensive backs coach for the Atlanta Falcons, Tampa Bay Buccaneers and Houston Texans.

Playing career
Hoke played high school football at Fairmont East High School in Kettering, Ohio.  He then attended Ball State University, where he played defensive back on the football team.  Hoke was a two-time all-Mid-American Conference (MAC) selection and his team earned league titles in 1976 and 1978.

Hoke spent time in the NFL as a player with the Chicago Bears and Kansas City Chiefs from 1980 to 1981.

Coaching career

College
Hoke embarked on a coaching career in 1982. As a secondary coach, he served at the University of Dayton, North Carolina State University, and Bowling Green State University. Hoke was hired by head coach Denny Stolz at Bowling Green and then him when Stolz was hired at San Diego State University. After Stolz's dismissal at San Diego State, Hoke went Kent State University, the University of Missouri, and the University of Florida.

Hoke served as defensive coordinator for Kent State in 1993 and Florida from 1999 to 2001.  At Florida, Hoke replaced friend Bob Stoops, who had left to become the head coach at Oklahoma.  Hoke and Stoops had served on the same Kent State staff in 1989 under Dick Crum, and Stoops recommended Hoke as his successor.  Hoke left Florida when Gators head coach Steve Spurrier took the head coaching job with the Washington Redskins of the National Football League (NFL).

When Spurrier returned to college football to coach South Carolina in 2004, he asked Hoke to join him as defensive coordinator.  After deliberating with his family, Hoke declined Spurrier's offer.

On Wednesday, February 4, 2015, Hoke re-joined Spurrier, this time at South Carolina.

In 2019, Hoke was hired as the defensive coordinator at the University of Maryland, College Park under head coach Mike Locksley. Hoke was a Broyles Award nominee in 2020 for best assistant coach in college football.

National Football League

Houston Texans
Hoke joined the expansion Houston Texans of the NFL in 2002 as secondary coach under Dom Capers, and was retained by new head coach Gary Kubiak in 2005.

Chicago Bears
Hoke joined the Chicago Bears as defensive backs coach under head coach Lovie Smith in 2009, taking over for Steven Wilks.  In 2012, the Minnesota Vikings asked the Bears for permission to interview Hoke for their vacant defensive coordinator position, but were denied.

Hoke was one of two Smith assistants to be retained by new Bears head coach Marc Trestman for the 2013 season.

On January 21, 2015, the Bears announced that Ed Donatell had been hired as the defensive backs coach under new head coach John Fox.  Hoke was informed by the Bears that his contract would not be optioned and he would not be asked to return.

Tampa Bay Buccaneers
On January 16, 2016, Hoke was hired as the defensive backs coach for the Tampa Bay Buccaneers

Atlanta Falcons
On January 26, 2021, Hoke was hired by the Atlanta Falcons as their defensive backs coach under head coach Arthur Smith. He was fired on January 27, 2023.

Chicago Bears (second stint)
On February 1, 2023, the Chicago Bears announced that Hoke was hired as their new cornerbacks coach and passing game coordinator.

Personal life
Hoke is the older brother of Brady Hoke, who was previously the head football coach at the University of Michigan until December 2, 2014.

Hoke and his wife, Jody, have four children: Mallory, Kyle, and twins Kendall and Carly.  Kyle Hoke played college football for his uncle Brady at Ball State and served as a graduate assistant coach for Western Michigan, Army and South Carolina.  Kyle is currently the safeties coach at San Diego State University since 2020 after previously serving as the defensive coordinator at John Carroll.

References

External links
 Chicago Bears profile
 Maryland profile
 

1957 births
Living people
American football defensive backs
Atlanta Falcons coaches
Ball State Cardinals football players
Bowling Green Falcons football coaches
Chicago Bears coaches
Chicago Bears players
Florida Gators football coaches
Houston Texans coaches
Kent State Golden Flashes football coaches
Maryland Terrapins football coaches
Missouri Tigers football coaches
NC State Wolfpack football coaches
San Diego State Aztecs football coaches
Tampa Bay Buccaneers coaches
Sportspeople from Hamilton, Ohio
People from Kettering, Ohio
Coaches of American football from Ohio
Players of American football from Ohio